John Edward Heys (born April 24, 1954) is an American independent filmmaker, actor and writer who lives and works in Berlin.

Life and career
John Edward Heys was born and raised in New Jersey. Upon his father's death two days after Heys' 12th birthday, he was enrolled  and educated (grades 7 thru 12) at a private boarding school in northern New Jersey.  After graduating  from secondary school, Heys moved to Miami Shores, Florida, to the home of his maternal aunts.

After two semesters of college majoring in Liberal Arts, Heys moved to New York City in 1968 and became part of the East Village and West Village alternative life and LGBTQ culture. In August 1969, he founded America's first bi-monthly newspaper for the LGBTQ community, Gay Power, the official title totaling 24 issues, and was editor until August 1970. One of its covers was created by Robert Mapplethorpe. The newspaper also contained illustrations by Touko Laaksonen, better known as Tom of Finland, and featured contributors such as Arthur Bell, Taylor Mead, Charles Ludlam, Pudgy Roberts, Bill Vehr, Pat Maxwell, Clayton Cole, as well as columns from all of the active LGBSTG groups, from the most conservative Mattachine Society to the most radical The Gay Liberation Front, and all the other groups in between. Heys created several one-man performance pieces and acted with Cookie Mueller, H.M. Koutoukas, Charles Ludlam, Ethyl Eichelberger and as part of the Angels of Light NYC Group, which Hibiscus founded after moving to NYC. Heys was a subject for artists Peter Hujar, Francesco Clemente, Charles Ludlam, Richard Banks, Frank Moore and numerous other photographers. Heys was a close friend and muse of photographer Peter Hujar and the subject of many portraits. Hujar once remarked upon Heys' resemblance to Diana Vreeland, "I can take a picture of her and another of you and there is a resemblance". In Berlin he was a friend of Charlotte von Mahlsdorf, the Neue Deutsche Welle (New Wave) band Die Tödliche Doris, and radical gay activist Napoleon Seyfarth. Heys made two films of Charlotte von Mahlsdorf and one of Napoleon Seyfarth and was the subject of an 8mm short film that Wolfgang Mueller made in 1984 in the legendary 1930s bordello, Pensione Florian.

Heys' films have been screened at many worldwide film festivals.

Theater (actor)

 Le Bourgeois Avant Garde, 1982
 Galas, 1983
 Sounds in The Distance, 1984, by David Wojnarowicz The Berlin Debut in 1984, and a second production in Brooklyn, New York, late 1980s
 Salammbo, 1985, by Charles Ludlam
 The Roman Polanski Story, by Gary Indiana, Heys portraying Polanski.
 Homage to Diana Vreeland Heys portrayed Diana Vreeland in several solo performances at LaMama ETC 
 The Woman with Pearls, 1980's    
 Nose to Nose, with Suzanne Fletcher NYC, 1980's
 Poverty in the Penthouse - La Mamounia, Berlin 1984- NYC, late 1980s
 Nerris the Nurse, to Ethyl Eichelberger's Medea. (Premier) Club 57 NYC, approximately performances, at Snafu, Paradise Garage, other venues. 1980's
 Cookie Mueller & John Heys Together at Last, Cafe Schmidt, NYC, March 1981

Film actor 
 John Heys Singt, directed by Wolfgang Müller
 Final Reward, directed by Rachid Kerdouche, 1978
 Triple Bogey on a Par Five Hole, directed by Amos Poe
 Agnes und Sein Bruder, Oscar Rolle-Berlin early 2000s

Theatre (director) 
 The Human Voice, starring Alba Clemente, NYC  Early 1990s

Filmmaker 
 The Moroccan Bride, 1987 Premiere, Millennium, NYC 
 Charlotte in Sweden, 1998  Premiere Berlinale -Panorama
 Golden Earrings, 2000 Premiere at original Arsenal -Berlin
 Alarm, 2001 Festival circuit
 Cooch Dance, 2008 Berlinale
 The La Ronde Superclub, 2008 Berlinale
 Das Ende des Schweins ist der Anfang der Wurst ("End of the Pig and Start of the Sausage"), 2009, Napoleon Seyfarth, Documentary, Premiere Berlinale-Panorama
 Charlotte, 2009 Festival circuit
 Warum Madam Warum, 2011, with Zazie De Paris, Premiere Berlinale -Panorama
 A Lazy Summer Afternoon with Mario Montez, 2011 Premiere Berlinale-Panorama
 "The Actress" with Zazie De Paris, 2013
 Madame Arthur, 2015, Shortfilm with Zazie de Paris
 "The Lift" 2018
 "STROLL." 2021

Film festivals

 Berlinale Panorama, Berlin 2009
 56. Internationale Kurzfilmtage, Oberhausen 2010
 Oslo Gay and Lesbian Film Festival, Oslo 2011,
 LLAMALEH - Uruguay International Film Festival of Sexual and Gender Diversity, Montevideo 2011
 Paris Gay, Lesbian, Trans Film Festival - Chéries-Chéris, Paris 2011
 The Barcelona International Gay and Lesbian Film Festival, Barcelona 2011
 Annual Pink Screens, Brussels 2011
 Berlinale Panorama, Berlin 2012
 Rio Festival Gay de Cinema, Rio de Janeiro 2012
 OutView Film Festival, Athens 2012
 Künstlerhaus Mousonturm, Frankfurt am Main 2012

References

External links 
 http://www.johnedwardheys.net Personal website
 John Edward Heys papers, circa 1962-2001 (bulk 1969-2000), held by the Billy Rose Theatre Division, New York Public Library for the Performing Arts
 John Edward Heys papers, additions, 1930s-2011, held by the Billy Rose Theatre Division, New York Public Library for the Performing Arts

American film directors
American theatre directors
American male stage actors
Living people
1948 births